Knoxville High School was a public high school in Knoxville, Tennessee, that operated from 1910 to 1951, enrolling grades 10 to 12. Its building is a contributing property in the Emory Place Historic District, which is listed on the National Register of Historic Places. The building was more recently used for adult education programs offered by Knox County Schools.

The building is currently being converted into senior assisted living

History 

The Knoxville High School building, located on East Fifth Avenue in Knoxville, was completed in 1910, enrolling male and female students who had previously attended separate high schools.  W. J. Barton was the school's first principal. W. E. Evans served as principal from 1917 until the school closed in 1951. Enrollment grew to just over 2,000 in the early 1920s and reached a peak of about 2,300 around the beginning of World War II.

The school was known for many years as a school sports powerhouse, winning a total of 13 Tennessee state championships and six Southern championships in football, as well as national championships in 1930 and 1937.

By 1948, the building had become inadequate, and city schools Superintendent Tom Prince warned that the Southern Association of Colleges and Secondary Schools was threatening to strip Knoxville High's accreditation.  In response, the city built three new schools: Fulton High School, West High School, East High School, and made improvements  to South High School and Austin High.  Knoxville High closed in 1951.

After the school was closed, the city school district used the building for administrative offices. Following consolidation of the city and county schools, Knox County Schools has used the building for adult education.

Building 
The original Knoxville High School building was designed in a classical revival style by Knoxville architect Albert Baumann Sr., who also designed the Knoxville Post Office and Federal Building, the Andrew Johnson Hotel, and the Cherokee Country Club, as well as some of the city's early-20th-century Victorian homes. The building was expanded in both 1914 and 1920 to accommodate increased enrollment.

The building is included in the Emory Place Historic District, which was listed on the National Register of Historic Places on November 10, 1994. Knox Heritage, a local historic preservation organization, included it on its 2010 "Fragile Fifteen" list of endangered historic properties due to concerns about its ongoing maintenance.  A World War I monument, erected in 1921, stands on the school's front lawn.

Notable alumni 
Notable people who attended Knoxville High School include the following:
 James Agee, Pulitzer Prize-winning author of A Death in the Family
 Tommy Bartlett, collegiate athlete and coach in both basketball and tennis
 Edward Boling, president of the University of Tennessee from 1970 to 1986
 Harvey Broome, lawyer who helped to found the Great Smoky Mountains National Park and is the namesake of the Knoxville chapter of the Sierra Club
 Clarence Brown, film director
 Mary Costa, professional opera singer and actress, who is best known for providing the voice of Princess Aurora in Walt Disney's Sleeping Beauty (1959 film).
 Jerome Courtland, actor who starred in several Walt Disney films and shows
 John Cullum, actor and singer
 Charles "Chili" Dean, chairman of the Tennessee Valley Authority board from 1988 to 1990
Roddie Edmonds, Righteous Among the Nations—Master Sergeant, United States Army during World War II who as a POW saved more than 200 Jewish American soldiers
 Norman C. Gaddis, United States Air Force general who was a POW during the Vietnam War
 Guilford Glazer, industrialist, real estate developer, and philanthropist
 David Madden, novelist.
 Robert Monroe, United States Navy vice admiral who commanded the Atlantic fleet
 Patricia Neal, award-winning actress 
 Sara O'Meara, actress and founder of the organization Childhelp
 Robert Rochelle, invented the Vanguard satellite communications system
 Kyle Testerman, mayor of Knoxville in the 1970s and 1980s
 Pug Vaughan, football player
 John Ward, longtime announcer for Tennessee Volunteers football and basketball
 Maurice F. Weisner, 4-star Admiral, Commander-in-Chief U.S. Pacific Forces

References 

Schools in Knoxville, Tennessee
Educational institutions established in 1910
Educational institutions disestablished in 1951
School buildings on the National Register of Historic Places in Tennessee
Defunct schools in Tennessee
1910 establishments in Tennessee
Historic district contributing properties in Tennessee
National Register of Historic Places in Knoxville, Tennessee